The 8th Golden Bell Awards was held on 26 March 1972 at the Ambassador Hotel in Taipei, Taiwan. The ceremony was hosted by Chang Shu-wen.

Winners

References

1972
1972 in Taiwan